Jodie Lawaetz (born September 3, 1965) is a swimmer who represented the United States Virgin Islands. She competed in two events at the 1984 Summer Olympics.

References

External links
 

1965 births
Living people
United States Virgin Islands female swimmers
Olympic swimmers of the United States Virgin Islands
Swimmers at the 1984 Summer Olympics
Pan American Games competitors for the United States Virgin Islands
Swimmers at the 1983 Pan American Games
Place of birth missing (living people)
21st-century American women